Victoria Plantation is a rural locality in the Shire of Hinchinbrook, Queensland, Australia. In the  Victoria Plantation had a population of 156 people.

Geography 

Victoria Plantation is directly east of the town of Ingham. It is a sugarcane growing area, with a network of cane tramways connecting the plantations to the Victoria Sugar Mill in the south of the locality beside Palm Creek.

History 
Victoria Plantation Provisional School opened on 1 March 1894, becoming Victoria Plantation State School on 1 January 1909.

In the  Victoria Plantation had a population of 156 people.

Education 
Victoria Plantation State School is a government primary (Prep-6) school for boys and girls at 244 Forrest Beach Road.
In 2016, the school had an enrolment of 74 students with 8 teachers (5 full-time equivalent) with 6 non-teaching staff (4 full-time equivalent). In 2018, the school had an enrolment of 38 students with 4 teachers (3 full-time equivalent) and 5 non-teaching staff (3 full-time equivalent).

There are no secondary schools in Victoria Plantation. The nearest government secondary school is Ingham State High School in neighbouring Ingham to the west. Other non-government schools are available in Ingham.

See also
 List of tramways in Queensland

References

Further reading

External links 

 

Shire of Hinchinbrook
Localities in Queensland